To Catch a Thief is a 1955 American romantic thriller film directed by Alfred Hitchcock, from a screenplay by John Michael Hayes based on the 1952 novel of the same name by David Dodge. The film stars Cary Grant as a retired cat burglar who has to save his reformed reputation by catching an impostor preying on the wealthy tourists (including the daughter of a wealthy widow, played by Grace Kelly) of the French Riviera.

Plot

Retired jewel thief John "The Cat" Robie is suspected by the police in a string of burglaries on the French Riviera. When they come to his hilltop villa to question him, he slips their grasp and heads to a restaurant owned by his friend Bertani. The restaurant's staff are members of Robie's old gang, who have been paroled for their work in the French Resistance during World War II. They are angry at Robie because they are all under suspicion as long as the new Cat is active. When the police arrive at the restaurant looking for Robie, Foussard's daughter spirits him to safety; Danielle is a young woman who fancies him dearly.

Robie realizes he can prove his innocence by catching the new Cat in the act. He enlists the aid of an insurance man, H. H. Hughson, who reluctantly discloses a list of the most expensive jewelry owners currently on the Riviera. American tourists Jessie Stevens, a wealthy nouveau riche widow, and her daughter Frances, top the list. Robie strikes up a friendship with them. Frances feigns modesty at first, but kisses Robie at the end of the night before retiring to her room.

The day after, Frances invites Robie to a swim at the beach, where Robie runs into Danielle.  He keeps up his cover of being a wealthy American tourist, despite Danielle's jealous barbs about his interest in Frances. Frances accompanies Robie on a "picnic" to a villa, where Robie suspects the new Cat might break in. Frances reveals that she knows Robie's real identity. He initially denies it, but concedes it that evening when she has invited him to her room to watch a fireworks display. They kiss passionately.

The next morning, Jessie discovers her jewels are gone. Frances accuses Robie of using her as a distraction, so he could steal her mother's jewelry. The police are called, but by the time they reach Jessie's room, Robie has disappeared.

Later, Robie is staking out an estate at night when he is attacked by an unknown assailant. A second attacker raises a wrench and appears to hit Robie, who falls off the estate's seawall into the water. But when the police reach the body in the water, it turns out to be Foussard, one of the staff at Bertani's restaurant.

The police chief publicly announces that Foussard was the jewel thief, but, as Robie points out privately in the abashed Hughson's presence, this would have been impossible because Foussard had a wooden leg, and could not climb on rooftops.

Foussard's funeral is interrupted by Danielle's loud accusation that Robie is responsible for her father's death. Outside the graveyard, Frances apologizes to Robie and confesses her love. Robie asks Frances to arrange his attendance at a fancy masquerade ball, where he believes the Cat will strike again.

Robie accompanies Frances to the ball dressed as a masked Moor. The police hover nearby. Upstairs, the cat burglar silently cleans out several jewel boxes. When Jessie addresses the Moor as "John" and asks him to go and get her "heart pills", the authorities are tipped off as to his identity. Upon the masked Moor's return, the police wait as he and Frances dance together all night. When the masked Moor and Frances go to her room, the mask is removed: it was Hughson, who switched places with Robie to conceal Robie's exit.

Robie lurks on the rooftop, and his patience is finally rewarded when he spots a figure in black, who is revealed to be Danielle. The police throw a spotlight on him and demand he halt, giving Danielle the chance to slip away from him. He flees as they shoot at him, but he nonetheless manages to corner his foe with jewels in hand. She loses her footing on the roof, but Robie grabs her hand before she falls. While she hangs in his grasp, he forces her to confess to the police and admit that Bertani was the ringleader of this gang.

Robie speeds back to his villa. Frances follows to convince him that she has a place in his life. He agrees, but looks less than thrilled when she says, "Mother will love it up here."

Cast

 Cary Grant as John Robie ("The Cat")
 Grace Kelly as Frances Stevens
 Jessie Royce Landis as Jessie Stevens
 John Williams as H. H. Hughson
 Charles Vanel as Monsieur Bertani
 Brigitte Auber as Danielle Foussard
 Jean Martinelli as Foussard, Danielle's father
 Georgette Anys as Germaine, housekeeper
 René Blancard as Commissaire Lepic (uncredited)
 Paul Newlan as Vegetable Man in Kitchen (uncredited)

Cast notes
Alfred Hitchcock makes his signature cameo, approximately ten minutes into the film, as a bus passenger sitting next to Cary Grant and a caged pair of birds.

Production
To Catch a Thief was the director's first film (of five) made using the VistaVision widescreen process, and the last of the three Hitchcock films with Grace Kelly. The film was the penultimate collaboration with Cary Grant; only North by Northwest (1959) followed. It is also about a man with a mistaken identity who goes on a breakneck adventure to prove his innocence.

The costumes were by Edith Head, including Kelly's memorable gold lamé gown for the film's costume ball.

The car driven by Grace Kelly was a metallic blue 1953 Sunbeam Alpine Mk I.

Locations
To Catch a Thief was filmed largely in the Paramount Studios, Hollywood, California, and on location in the Alpes-Maritimes of southeastern France, on the Mediterranean coast. It included the resorts of Cannes, Nice, Villefranche-sur-Mer and Saint-Jeannet.

Crucial to the film's success in shooting on location was the presence of unit production manager C.O. "Doc" Erickson. He had developed a reputation for his work on prior Paramount films that had relied on a great amount of location photography, such as Shane (1953) and Secret of the Incas (1954). Erickson thoroughly researched the logistics of shooting in the South of France and communicated with Bill Mull, the production manager on Little Boy Lost (1953).

Distribution
To Catch a Thief is the only Hitchcock film released by Paramount that is still owned and controlled by the company. The others were sold to Hitchcock in the early 1960s and are currently distributed by Universal Studios.

Reception
The film drew mixed reviews from critics, with some enjoying Grant and Kelly in the lead roles as well as the French Riviera setting, while others expressed disappointment at the lack of suspense compared to earlier Hitchcock films.

Bosley Crowther of The New York Times wrote in a positive review that the film "comes off completely as a hit in the old Hitchcock style ... Mr. Grant and Miss Kelly do grandly, especially in one sly seduction scene." Variety wrote that while the film was "not the suspense piece one usually associated with the Alfred Hitchcock name," it was "strong on sight and performance values" though it had "some plot weaknesses and is not as smooth in the unfolding as one might expect from an upper 'A' presentation."

Harrison's Reports wrote, "Alfred Hitchcock has not endowed the action with as much suspense as one might expect in a picture produced and directed by him; nevertheless, its story of a one-time jewel robber who sets out to establish his innocence by catching a thief who was using his technique is tight and swiftly-paced, and constantly offers dramatic and comical developments." Richard L. Coe of The Washington Post called it "one of those de luxe pictures in which everyone lives in glorious workless luxury on the French Rivera, looks wonderful, speaks amusingly and is unconcerned with transit strikes or hurricanes. I loved every minute of it."

Philip K. Scheuer of the Los Angeles Times was also positive, calling Grant and Kelly "ideal in the romantic leads" and the dialogue "daring but delightful," adding, "Above all, there is the spell of the French Riviera—a lazy, laissez-faire thing that apparently captivated the director as much as it will audiences in the soft, beguiling hues of its Technicolor and VistaVision."

John McCarten of The New Yorker dismissed the film as "an Alfred Hitchcock picture that makes you wonder what has happened to the man ... As the heiress, Grace Kelly is very pretty. She does not, presumably, try to act." The Monthly Film Bulletin wrote, "Even a comedy thriller needs considerably more in the way of plain excitement and tension than To Catch a Thief provides, and Hitchcock's celebrated habit of playing tricks with the audience ... seem a poor substitute for the real thing."

The Guardian called the film "a thorough disappointment," writing that Hitchcock had "failed so completely that one can only wonder if, in this tale of high-class burglary on the Côte d'Azur, he has not altogether abandoned his devotion to 'tension.' Certainly the 'whodunnit' element in this film is remarkably slack; the unmasking of the master criminal, which is the climax of the story, comes as mildly as bread and milk."

François Truffaut wrote "To Catch a Thief completely satisfies all [Hitchcock's] fans—the snobbiest and the most ordinary—and still manages to be one of the most cynical films Hitchcock has ever made."

On Rotten Tomatoes the film has an approval rating of 92% based on reviews from 53 critics, with an average rating of 7.9/10, with the critical consensus reading: "It may occasionally be guilty of coasting on pure charm, but To Catch a Thief has it in spades -- as well as a pair of perfectly matched stars in Cary Grant and Grace Kelly."

Accolades
Robert Burks won the Academy Award for Best Cinematography, while Hal Pereira, Joseph McMillan Johnson, Samuel M. Comer and Arthur Krams were nominated for Best Art Direction, and Edith Head was nominated for Best Costume Design.

In 2002, American Film Institute included the film in AFI's 100 Years...100 Passions (#46).

Adaptations
In May 2018, it was announced that Viacom was set to adapt the film as a Spanish-language television series. It was launched in October 2019 as Atrapa a un ladrón (es).

See also
 List of American films of 1955

References

Bibliography

Further reading
 "Two Interviews About To Catch a Thief by Tifenn Brisset, Film International magazine Vol. 11, No. 6, 2013, pages 13–21. Interviews with French script supervisor Sylvette Baudrot conducted September 2011 and actress Brigitte Auber, September 2011, March 2013, regarding their work on the film and with Cary Grant and Alfred Hitchcock. Discussion of a different ending and script differences. Twelve color photographs, nine pages.

External links

 
 
 
 
 
 Historic reviews, photo gallery at CaryGrant.net

1955 films
1950s mystery thriller films
1950s romantic thriller films
American mystery thriller films
American romantic thriller films
1950s English-language films
Films based on American novels
Films based on mystery novels
Films directed by Alfred Hitchcock
Films produced by Alfred Hitchcock
Films scored by Lyn Murray
Films set in Monaco
Films set on the French Riviera
Films shot in France
Films shot in Monaco
Films whose cinematographer won the Best Cinematography Academy Award
1950s French-language films
Paramount Pictures films
Films with screenplays by John Michael Hayes
1950s multilingual films
American multilingual films
1950s American films